Amydria anceps is a moth of the family Acrolophidae. It is found in Mexico.

It is unusual in that its caterpillars actually eat the discarded fungus culture grown by leaf-cutter ants, ''Atta mexicana; this moth is always (obligately) associated as a harmless guest on the nests of this ant species.

References

Moths described in 1914
Acrolophidae